Rafael Ramírez Hidalgo  (1805–1875) was a Costa Rican politician.

He was a member of the Constituent Assembly of 1838, 1859, 1869, 1870 and 1871, President of the House of Representatives from 1844–1845 and the Senate from 1862 to 1863 and judge on several occasions. He was the president of the Supreme Court of Costa Rica from 1847 to 1850 and from 1854 to 1855. He was also associate judge of the Supreme Court in 1859 and Secretary of State in 1873.

He was the author of the notes contained in the edition of the General Code of the State of Costa Rica from 1841 published in New York in 1858, which was declared official by the government of President Juan Rafael Mora Porras.

External links
Costa Rican Judicial System

1805 births
1875 deaths
Costa Rican politicians
Supreme Court of Justice of Costa Rica judges